Back to Black is a 2006 album by Amy Winehouse.

Back to Black may also refer to:

 "Back to Black" (song), the album's title track, 2007
 Back to Black (band), an American R&B band
 Amy Winehouse: Back to Black, a 2018 documentary film about Winehouse
 Back to Black (film), an upcoming biographical film about Winehouse

See also
 Back in Black (disambiguation)